Tollensesee is a zungenbecken lake in Mecklenburg-Vorpommern, Germany. It belongs to the Mecklenburg Lake District. At an elevation of 14.8 m, its surface area is 17.4 km². Its maximum depth is about 33 m. The lake is 10.4 km long and between 1.5 and 2.5 km wide. The entire lake lies within the administrative area of the city of Neubrandenburg. In the south part of the lake there is island Fischerinsel.

See also

External links 

 

Lakes of Mecklenburg-Western Pomerania
Neubrandenburg
LTollensesee